Ülo Jaaksoo (born 16 April 1939 in Mõisaküla) is an Estonian computer scientist.

In 1969, he graduated from Tallinn University of Technology in engineering.

Since 2013, he is the chairman of Supervisory Board of AS Cybernetica.

In 2004, he was awarded with Order of the White Star, III class.

References

1939 births
Living people
Estonian computer scientists
Tallinn University of Technology alumni
Academic staff of the Tallinn University of Technology
Recipients of the Order of the White Star, 3rd Class
People from Mulgi Parish